Crest Animation Productions (formerly RichCrest Animation Studios, Rich Animation Studios and originally Rich Entertainment) was an Indian-American animation studio located in Burbank, California, United States. The studio's most well known work include Alpha and Omega, Norm of the North, and The Swan Princess.

History
The studio was founded by film director Richard Rich in 1986, who previously worked at Walt Disney Productions. He initially had 26 employees, most of them coming from Disney such as former marketing chief Matt Mazer. Around that time, Rich was contacted by Jared F. Brown to produce half-hour animated videos based on audio cassettes of the Book of Mormon for his Living Scriptures firm. They subsequentially expanded to educational animated Christian and historical videos for children through a sister company Family Entertainment Network. 

In 1993, Rich Animation Studios was fully acquired by Nest Entertainment, a holding company that also combined Family Entertainment Network and Cassette Duplicators Inc., a cassette-duplicator in West Valley City. On the heels of the videos' success, the two studios produced The Swan Princess in 1994, based on the classic ballet Swan Lake. Despite being a box-office disappointment, it sold well on video and spawned two sequels, The Swan Princess: Escape from Castle Mountain and The Swan Princess: The Mystery of the Enchanted Kingdom. 

In 1999, the two studios teamed up with Morgan Creek Productions and Rankin/Bass Productions to produce an animated adaptation of Rodgers and Hammerstein's The King and I for Warner Bros. However, the film bombed at the box office and received very negative reviews, which forced Nest Family Entertainment to sell off the studio to Crest Animation Studios in 2000. The studio was renamed to RichCrest Animation Studios, and they continued to produce Bible videos for Nest until 2005. 

In February 2007, RichCrest was renamed to Crest Animation Productions and announced that it was "expanding its business to become a full-service animation studio specializing in the development and production of CGI-animated properties for theatrical, television, home entertainment and interactive distribution". 

The studio was finally shut down in 2013, after failing to make a profit. Many of its productions contracts were handed over to other studios for completion. Norm of the North, a film that was in production at Crest before closing, along with future Alpha and Omega sequels were handed over to Splash Entertainment while future Swan Princess installments were handled by Streetlight Animation, which Rich also formed.

Filmography

Theatrical Features

Rich era

RichCrest era

Crest era

Direct-to-Video
Rich era

RichCrest era

Crest era
Note: All films CGI.

Films originally slated for production at Crest

References

American animation studios
Companies based in Los Angeles County, California
Indian animation studios
Visual effects companies
Indian companies established in 1986
Mass media companies established in 1986
Mass media companies disestablished in 2013
Indian companies disestablished in 2013
Film production companies based in Mumbai
1986 establishments in California
2013 disestablishments in California